Quarto dei Mille is a residential district in the east of Genoa. Overlooking the sea and between the "Sturla" and "Quinto al mare" districts, it was originally called the "Quarto al mare". 

In 1860, the "Expedition of the Thousand" (Garibaldi's volunteer force) embarked for Sicily there. The district was later renamed in honor of this event. In 1926 it was integrated into Greater Genoa.

Quartieri of Genoa